This is a list of Azerbaijani language television channels.

List of channels

Azerbaijan 
This is a list of television channels that broadcast in Azerbaijan.

State-owned

Private

Nationwide

Regional

International

Discontinued 
 Aztv 2
 Sara TV
 BMTI
 ABA
 Lankaran TV
 STV

Iran 
 SAHAR TV from Tehran
 Sahand TV from Tabriz
 Eshragh TV from Zanjan
 Sabalan TV from Ardabil
 West Azerbaijan TV from Urmia

United States 
GünAz TV from Chicago
AN.T

Iraq 
 Türkmeneli TV from Kirkuk

See also
 Television in Azerbaijan

References 

Lists of television channels by language
Television channels